Interstate 59 (I-59) is an Interstate Highway located in the southeastern United States. It is a north–south route that spans  from a junction with I-10 and I-12 at Slidell, Louisiana, to a junction with I-24 near Wildwood, Georgia.

The highway connects the metropolitan areas of New Orleans, Louisiana; Birmingham, Alabama; and Chattanooga, Tennessee, running closely parallel to the older U.S. Route 11 (US 11) corridor for the entire distance. Approximately one-third of the route, spanning  from Meridian, Mississippi, to Birmingham, Alabama, overlaps that of the east–west I-20.

I-59 is a four-lane freeway along its entire route, other than a short stretch extending from north of Tuscaloosa, Alabama, through Birmingham, where it widens to six lanes or more.

Route description

|-
|LA
|
|-
|MS
|
|-
|AL
|
|-
|GA
|
|-
|Total
|
|}

Louisiana

I-59 spans  in Louisiana, the shortest distance in the four states through which it travels. The route begins at a partial cloverleaf interchange with I-10 (exit 267) and I-12 (exit 85) at the northeast corner of Slidell, a city in St. Tammany Parish. From this interchange, connections are made to New Orleans and Hammond, as well as Bay St. Louis, Mississippi. Heading north, I-59 has two exits serving the town of Pearl River, where it begins a concurrency with US 11. Immediately afterward, the highway crosses the West Pearl River and passes through an interchange with Old US 11, a portion of the pre-Interstate alignment serving the Pearl River Wildlife Management Area. I-59 then travels through the Honey Island Swamp for  before crossing the main branch of the Pearl River into Mississippi.

Mississippi
In Mississippi, I-59 continues to run parallel with US 11, traversing mainly rural areas but going through or bypassing the towns of Picayune, Poplarville, Hattiesburg, Moselle, Ellisville, Laurel, and Meridian.

For its length in Mississippi, I-59 either runs concurrently with, or runs close to, US 11. Between the towns of Pearl River and Picayune, US 11 travels concurrent with I-59. The highway also has concurrencies with US 98 in Hattiesburg; Mississippi Highway 42 (MS 42) just north of Hattiesburg; US 84 and MS 15 in Laurel; and US 80, US 11, and MS 19 in the Meridian area.

A notoriously sharp S-curve, at milepost 96 in Laurel, was the subject of a large reconstruction project that began in 2006. Those sharp curves were the legacy of an overpass over the Southern Railway on a town bypass with design dating from before the Interstate Highways, and they featured a  speed limit, one of the lowest anywhere on the Interstate Highway System. This work was completed in 2009.

The exit numbers are given as those of I-59.

At 4:00 pm on August 27, 2005, for the first time in its history, the southbound lanes of I-59 were temporarily redirected northward to accommodate evacuation for Hurricane Katrina. This was a previously agreed to joint plan by the states of Mississippi and Louisiana called contraflow lane reversal.

Alabama

I-59 and I-20 travel together for about 40 percent of their route through Alabama, passing northeast through Tuscaloosa before finally parting ways in eastern Birmingham.

In Birmingham, many wrecks and accidents occur near the crossover interchange of I-20/I-59 and I-65 (commonly called "Malfunction Junction"). On two occasions, 18-wheelers crashed and burned fiercely enough to melt the support beams of overpasses. Beginning in eastern Birmingham, I-59 continues on its own northeast, passing by Gadsden and Fort Payne in the foothills of the Appalachian Mountains before entering Georgia.

I-59 from Gadsden at milemarker 182 to Stephen's Gap at milemarker 193 had degraded over the decades since it was opened into a rough concrete highway. Between 2010 and 2014, a construction project called "Project 59" took place between Gadsden and Fort Payne. This project consisted of reconstructing the Interstate Highway with unbonded concrete (without any space cracks) as well as modifications to the width and vertical clearance of the bridges and overpasses in the segment.

Georgia
I-59 has a short trek through Georgia, with only three exits before ending at I-24 several miles west of Chattanooga, Tennessee, in Wildwood, Georgia. The entire route of I-59 in Georgia is named Korean War Veterans Memorial Highway. I-59's southbound location is marked Birmingham instead of Gadsden in Georgia. Gadsden is the next city that I-59 southbound is traveling to right before the route reaches Birmingham. For services, I-59 has no direct access to the Georgia Welcome Center, instead I-59's Georgia Welcome Center is located in Trenton. Drivers must take I-59 Trenton exit 11 to get access to the Georgia Welcome Center. Within Georgia, it carries unsigned designated as State Route 406 (SR 406) for internal Georgia Department of Transportation (GDOT) purposes.

National Highway System
The entire length of I-59 is part of the National Highway System, a system of routes determined to be the most important for the nation's economy, mobility, and defense.

Exit list

Auxiliary routes
 I-359 in Tuscaloosa, Alabama
 I-459 in Birmingham, Alabama
 I-759 in Gadsden, Alabama

See also

References

External links

 
59
59
59
59
59
Transportation in St. Tammany Parish, Louisiana
Transportation in Pearl River County, Mississippi
Transportation in Lamar County, Mississippi
Transportation in Forrest County, Mississippi
Transportation in Jones County, Mississippi
Transportation in Jasper County, Mississippi
Transportation in Clarke County, Mississippi
Transportation in Lauderdale County, Mississippi
Transportation in Sumter County, Alabama
Transportation in Greene County, Alabama
Transportation in Tuscaloosa County, Alabama
Transportation in Jefferson County, Alabama
Transportation in St. Clair County, Alabama
Transportation in Etowah County, Alabama
Transportation in DeKalb County, Alabama
Transportation in Dade County, Georgia